Paul Alan Yule is a German archaeologist at the Ruprecht-Karls-Universität Heidelberg (habilitation). His main work targets the archaeology of Oman, Yemen, previously India.

Education and career 
Yule studied at the University of Minnesota (BA), New York University (MA and PhD) and Marburg University. His dissertation, Early Cretan Seals, classified and dated the seals from the Early and Middle Bronze Ages of Minoan Crete. In 1995 his habilitationsschrift at Heidelberg University analysed some 365 pre-Islamic graves in the eastern central part of Oman 

Within the framework of the Open Access movement Yule emphasises the archiving of his research materials and publications as soon as possible so as to make them publicly available. He does this largely by means of the image bank heidICON and the virtual library Propylaeum-Dok of the Heidelberg University Library. Since 2005 Yule has experimented in 3D recording and animation in India and Oman with the Fachhochschule Mainz (i3mainz) and with Laura Pecchioli.

South Asian research 
In the 1980s, with the support of Swami Omanand Saraswati, he catalogued and evaluated metallic artefacts of the so-called Copper Hoard Culture by means of European methods and models for the first time, whereby numerous finds came to light especially in the Kanya Gurukul in Narela/Haryana. These artefacts appear to be non-functional objects, probably used in rituals or simply deposited in hoards, to judge from a lack of use-wear. Far away in Odisha, Yule published a find from a metals period cemetery in Sankarjang which may be the earliest musical instrument in India. He documented the early historic fortress at Sisupalgarh by means of a laser scanner, ground penetrating radar and a hand-held GPS receiver. Together with Corinna Borchert, Yule uncovered illegal building development within this nationally protected Mauryan site. From 2001–2004 in India, Yule documented so-called mud forts and other archaeological sites for the first time, especially in Odisha along the Mahanadi and Chhattisgarh. Images of his work especially in Odisha appear in the image bank heidICON.

Arabian and East African research 
Yule's study of the prehistory of Oman began from 1982-1987 as a volunteer at the Deutsches Bergbau-Museum in Bochum together with Gerd Weisgerber. Yule focussed on the cataloguing of the metal hoard find from Ibri-Selme (and others as well), which he published with Gerd Weisgerber. This typological study catalogues the largest hoard of metallic artefacts to occur in the Near East. Stashed in an Umm an-Nar period communal tomb, these date to the Early Iron Age. In 1987 Yule began his habilitation on the site of Samad al-Shan which sheds light on the late pre-Islamic, protoliterate Late Iron Age population of central Oman. It comes into view as early as 200 BCE and we lose track of it around 300 CE far prior to the arrival of Islam in Oman. After 2006 he raised the chronology of the Samad Late Iron Age. The cemetery site, Samad, yields eastern Arabian artefacts of different periods. New excavations were intended to better date the Early Iron Age. New was the introduction of alphanumeric abbreviations for site and artefact classes to enable computer processing. In the mid 1990s Yule and Weisgerber mapped and studied the tower tombs of Jaylah in the eastern part of the Jebel Akhdhar, which may date to the Bronze Age Umm an-Nar Period mid-late 3rd millennium BCE. Yule sought unsuccessfully late antique habitation in his excavation at the oasis site of Izki/al-Yemen. Yule updated his thought on Oman in 2014. For south-eastern Arabia he distinguishes and defines Early and Late Iron Ages. In the Sultanate, the Late Iron Age has two facies. The one known from the most sites is designated Samad Late Iron Age, the other is the "période préislamique récente" which mostly French and Belgian colleagues researched and defined in the United Arab Emirates. Years after finishing the actual report, Yule realised the important publications for the excavations at al-Akhdhar, al-Wāsiṭ tomb W1 and other projects. In 2012 the Ministry of Heritage and Culture asked him to document and published an Early Iron Age metal smelting site just inside the Empty Quarter in Wadi Ḍank, ʿUqdat al-Bakrah.

At the site of Zafar, capital of the Himyarite Tribal Confederation, in the Yemenite highlands, field operations continued from 1998 to 2010 with a budget which eventually amounted to 5,300,000 Euros. This project illuminates especially the material culture of the Himyarite period (110 BCE – 525 CE). Yule excavated most notably a 1.70 m high relief-statue depicted wearing a crown which depicts arguably a Christian (Aksumite?) king. He argues that Himyarite culture is not really foreign to Islam which follows, but actually is a sire which passed on its genes. One wonders what Islamic religion and culture would be like without this influence. Excavated finds contradict the characterisation of Himyarite culture especially visual arts as decadent - a term which can be understood in different ways. Yule considered late pre-Islam in the Yemen to be his most important scientific contribution owing to the opportunity to work for several years and the large number of contexted finds.

In 2013 Steffen Wenig asked Yule to participate in an excavation project of a church at Mifsas Bahri in the South Tigray Region. Yule continued this work independently, enabled in 2014 to 2016 by means of a grant from the DFG. This centred on the excavation of a Late Aksumite church ruin of the 7th century CE.

References

External links 
 [University of Heidelberg, Prehistory and Near Eastern Archaeology http://www.ufg-va.uni-hd.de/mitarbeiter/yule_paul.html]
 [University of Heidelberg, Languages and Cultures of the Near East, Semitic Studies http://semitistik.uni-hd.de/yule.html]
 [Zafar/Yemen Photo Archive, University of Heidelberg Project http://heidicon.ub.uni-heidelberg.de/module/extlinks.php/pool/zafar]
 [Mifsas Bahri Project, University of Heidelberg Project: HeidICON, http://heidicon.ub.uni-heidelberg.de/pool/mifsas_bahri_project]
 [South Asian Archaeology Archive, South Asia Institute http://heidicon.ub.uni-heidelberg.de/BildsucheFrames?easydb=rc3e0ghn5d9u3jku8uiid6oo35]
 [Oman Archive, University of Heidelberg Project http://heidicon.ub.uni-heidelberg.de/pool/oman]
 [Orissa, University of Heidelberg Project http://crossasia-repository.ub.uni-heidelberg.de/147/]
 [Collected digital works of the author regarding South Asia, University of Heidelberg Project Savifa http://archiv.ub.uni-heidelberg.de/savifadok/view/schriftenreihen/sr-12.html]
 [Collected digital works of the author regarding Arabia, University of Heidelberg http://archiv.ub.uni-heidelberg.de/propylaeumdok/view/schriftenreihen/sr-5.html]
 [Zafar Virtual Museum ]
https://uni-heidelberg.academia.edu/paulyule

German archaeologists
Living people
University of Minnesota alumni
Academic staff of Heidelberg University
New York University alumni
German Indologists
People from Minneapolis
Illegal housing
German male non-fiction writers
German expatriates in the United States
Year of birth missing (living people)